Bracebridge Hemyng (1841 - 1901) was a British author.

Biography 

He was born in London, United Kingdom on 5 March 1841.

He was the eldest son of Dempster Hemyng, a successful barrister.

He got married in the United States, but later returned to London.

He died in London, United Kingdom on 18 September 1901.

Education  

He was educated at Eton, then, following his father's footsteps, he entered the Middle Temple and was Called to the Bar in 1862.

Career 

He did not succeed as a barrister, therefore he turned to writing as a career.

He began writing for newspapers and magazines. From there he progressed full time to writing novels.

Legacy 

His legacy has been described in the following words by The Literary Encyclopedia:

Bibliography 

His notable books include:

 Jack Harkaway's Boy Tinker Among The Turks by Bracebridge Hemyng
 Jack Harkaway and His Son's Escape from the Brigands of Greece
 Jack Harkaway in New York; or, The Adventures of the Travelers' Club by Hemyng
 The Slave of the Mine; or, Jack Harkaway in 'Frisco 
 Young Jack Harkaway Fighting the Pirates of the Red Sea

References

External links 
 Biography 1
 Biography 2
 Project Gutenberg
 Internet Archive

British writers
1841 births
1901 deaths